4ZZZ (pronounced "Four Triple Zed" or simply "Triple Zed") is an independent community radio station operating in Brisbane, Australia at the frequency 102.1 FM. As a community radio station, 4ZZZ is a member of the Community Broadcasting Association of Australia (CBAA). The station broadcasts to much of South East Queensland, parts of northern New South Wales and web streams from its website.

History
4ZZZ was established to provide a radical alternative to mainstream news, to promote a sense of engagement and activism in community life and to promote Australian music. The station began transmission on 8 December 1975 as 4ZZ at 105.7 MHz, the first FM community broadcaster in Brisbane transmitting in stereo.

The station's first studios were constructed by announcing staff and volunteers, using second-hand building materials and furniture. The first transmitter was hand built by the station engineer Ross Dannecker with help from Dave Aberdeen. Founders included activist, Jim Beatson, journalist Marian Wilkinson, Arts Administrator, John Stanwell and academic Alan Knight. Announcer John Woods launched the station with The Who's "Won't Get Fooled Again" at Midday 8 December 1975 (a month after The Dismissal). Along with 2JJJ and 3RRR, 4ZZZ has been a major promoter of independent and alternative music providing exposure for many Australian and international artists. Through the late 1970s and early 1980s the station also produced many groundbreaking and award-winning features and documentaries.

On 30 November 1978, the transmitter moved from the University of Queensland student union building to Mount Coot-tha when the station was granted a full licence. At this time, the frequency changed from 105.7 MHz to 102.1 Mhz.

4ZZZ pushed the boundaries by broadcasting illegal obscenities. In 1981 an organisation called "The Society to Outlaw Pornography" reported them to the Australian Broadcasting Authority. 4ZZZ successfully defended themselves, leading to changes which make it legal to swear on Australian TV and radio under certain circumstances.

On 14 December 1988, as part of a conservative backlash to the ousting of Queensland Premier Joh Bjelke-Petersen, 4ZZZ was taken off air and forcibly evicted from its University of Queensland premises by the then UQ Union ALSF and Young Nationals student union executive. While university students rallied to support the station, 4ZZZ moved to alternative premises on Coronation Drive in the suburb of Toowong. In 1994 the station was able to obtain a loan to buy the former headquarters of the Communist Party of Australia. 4ZZZ still broadcasts from these premises on Barry Parade in Fortitude Valley.

Station philosophy and funding
The motto for the station is agitate, educate, organise. (The saying dates from New York in the early 1880s.) They aim to "Provide a voice for marginalised communities" -

4ZZZ aims to challenge the mainstream media by providing access for the community to radio, by supporting local bands, artists and events, by providing training for station volunteers, and by disseminating alternative news and current affairs.

All fundraising is run by the station. The main sources of income are subscriptions, sponsorship, promotions and 4ZZZ events. 4ZZZ collaborates with local businesses, gig promoters, etc. to provide incentives such as discounts for subscribers.

The station's volunteers have won many awards including Community Broadcasting Association of Australia awards and national media awards.

In 2015 4ZZZ won the Tony Staley Award for excellence in community broadcasting for its efforts to include more people with a disability via the Ability Radio Project and appointed the first Station Advocate for People with a Disability in 2017.

Programming
As a community radio station, 4ZZZ broadcasts a wide variety of music, information and news. Presenters do not have to follow a playlist. Announcers personally choose the on-air musical content, or station subscribers request tracks. Unlike other radio stations, there is no music or program director. There are coordinators for those departments, however the ultimate decision rests with the program makers who must abide by the station policy of playing a minimum of 30% Australian or New Zealand based content, 30% new music (released in the previous four months), 30% female content (not just female vocal, including all female contribution to the work) and 15% local (broadcast area – South-East Qld). In 2018, after extensive consultation, 4ZZZ increased its female content quota to an aspirational 50%.

All 4ZZZ announcers are current financial subscribers to the station as well as dedicated volunteers who have completed the station's In House Announcer Training.

Programming is divided into two types of shifts, 'strip' shifts that broadcast a wide variety of music and information, news programs and 'block' shifts that cater to specific genres of music. Magazine shows (combination of music, host chat & banter and interviews) cross both formats.

The block programs on 4ZZZ include: The Anarchy Show, The Jazz Show, Locked In (Prisoners' Request Show), Nothin But The Blues, Rock 'n Roll Show, The Punk Show, Eco Radio, Queer Radio, Dykes on Mykes, SkaTrek, Film Club, The New Zealand Show, The Youth Show, Dark Essence, The Yard, Brisbane Line, World Beat, Megaherzzz, Goldilocks Folk, A Primate Evolved, Electric Crush, Indigi-Briz, Nowhere To Run, Paradigm Shift, Radio Reversal and Only Human.

4ZZZ events
The Hot 100 is broadcast New Years Day from Midday to approx 8 pm. In 2007, 4ZZZ commenced online voting.

Fundraising events include:
 Dub Day Afternoon (usually November)
 Brain Banana (usually Queen's Birthday weekend, June)
 Birthday Party (near 8 December)
 Radiothon (usually August or September), a subscription drive
 Market Day, an outdoor festival featuring local music (annually previous to 2003)

Winners of the Hot 100
 1976: The Beach Boys – "Good Vibrations"
 1980: Sex Pistols – "Anarchy in the UK"
 1982: The Clash – "London Calling"
 1983: Joy Division – "Love Will Tear Us Apart"
 1984: President's XI – "Summer Vacation"
 1985: Echo & The Bunnymen – "The Cutter"
 1986: The Cult – "She Sells Sanctuary"
 1987: Painters and Dockers – "Die Yuppie Die"
 1988: The Primitives – "Crash"
 1989: Dinosaur Jr. – "Freak Scene"
 1990: Sonic Youth – "Kool Thing"
 1991: Chopper Division – "Chill Out America"
 1992: Ministry – "Jesus Built My Hotrod"
 1993: The Breeders – "Cannonball"
 1994: Beastie Boys – "Sabotage"
 1995: Wishing Chair – "Dreaming"
 1996: Escape From Toytown – "Fish n Chip Bitch From Ipswich"
 1997: Blur – "Song 2"
 1998: Not from There – "Sich Offnen"
 1999: Regurgitator – "I Wanna Be A Nudist"
 2000: Dandy Warhols – "Bohemian Like You"
 2001: Gazoonga Attack – "Cinderella"
 2002: The White Stripes – "Fell In Love With A Girl"
 2003: Dollar Bar – "Cute Gurls Have the Best Diseases"
 2004: Dick Nasty – "I'm More Australian Than A Book of Bush Poetry by Russell Crowe"
 2005: The Disables – "ASIO"
 2006: Texas Tea – "Macy and Me"
 2007: Texas Tea – "Whiskey and Wine"
 2008: The Emu Smugglers – "Born and Bred (On Triple Zed)"
 2009: I Heart Hiroshima – "Shakeytown"
 2010: Transvaal Diamond Syndicate – "Home"
 2011: Gotye (featuring Kimbra) – "Somebody That I Used To Know" 
 2012: Velociraptor – "Cynthia"
 2013: The Flangipanis – "I'm Drunk, So What, Fuck You"
 2014: Violent Soho – "Saramona Said"
 2015: The Flangipanis – "Getting Shit For Free"
 2016: The Flangipanis – "Double Standards"
 2017: The Flangipanis – "Sportsball"
 2018: Waax – "Labrador"
 2019: Goatzilla – "Dropbear (The Legend of)"
 2020: The Flangipanis – "Asshole Aunt"
 2021: Waax – "Most Hated Girl"
 2022: Square Tugs feat. Polly Cooke – "I Don’t Like It"

1996 market day riots
Cybernana Market day was held on 19 October 1996 in Musgrave Park, West End. During the night, a large police presence was seen patrolling the area outside the fence around the Park. There were several arrests for alleged drug possession and other minor street offences. At around 8:20 p.m. a severe storm hit without warning and organisers were forced to close the event. Within 10 minutes more than half of the crowd had left and police began to appear in larger numbers.

It is estimated that more than 100 police were mobilised, including mounted police and police from the Public Safety Response Team equipped with riot gear. The arrival of such large numbers of police at less than 10 minutes notice indicated that police were on stand-by for the event. Crowds sheltering in tents were physically forced from the park, people attending the event were beaten with batons and arrested.

Complaints were made to the Criminal Justice Commission but no police were ever reprimanded.

References

Sources
 
 Knight, A. 2000. Won't get fooled again. 
 Olah, P. 2003. 4ZZZ market day riots of 1996. 
 4ZzZ Homepage, About 4ZZZ 
 Stafford, A 2004 Pig City 
 25th Birthday Celebrations 
 Media Search (including map of studio location) 
 Poster Archive 
 CBAA 2007 Awards 
 4ZzZ Market Day 2006 
 4ZZZ appoints advocate for people with a disability to increase inclusion

External links
 
 Hot 100

Community radio stations in Australia
Radio stations established in 1975
Radio stations in Brisbane
1975 establishments in Australia